Christopher Thomas Allmand FSA (18 April 1936 – 16 November 2022) was an English historian, who specialised in the Late Middle Ages in England and France. His particular research and teaching interests lay in the Hundred Years' War. He spent most of his teaching career at the University of Liverpool, becoming Professor of Medieval History, until his retirement in 1998.  Among many publications, he produced a much-used monograph on the Hundred Years' War and the leading biography of King Henry V.

Early life 
Allmand was born into a Catholic family and raised in Hampstead, London.  He was educated at  Ampleforth College, following in the footsteps of  his brother Michael.  Allmand attended Oriel College, Oxford and completed his PhD on the church in Normandy in the fifteenth century, supervised by E.F.Jacob.

Career 
Allmand taught at the University of Bangor before moving to take up a lectureship at the University of Liverpool, where he remained for the rest of his academic career.  He became a Senior Lecturer, Reader and finally Professor of History until his retirement in 1998.  During this time he also served as Head of Department.

Allmand played a major role in supporting history at a national level, serving as Associate Literary Director (1974–77) and then Literary Director  (1977–82) of the Royal Historical Society, of which he also became a Council Member (1985–89).

Allmand was elected a Fellow of the Royal Historical Society in 1965 and a Fellow of the Society of Antiquaries in 1976.

After retirement he conducted an exhaustive survey of every known manuscript of the influential Roman work of military history by Vegetius, the De Rei Militari.   This involved visiting libraries and archive collections across Europe.

Personal life and death 
Allmand's father was  A.J. Allmand, who held a  Chair in Chemistry at King's College, London until 1950, having early in his career during World War I  carried out important work on the use of gas.  He and his French wife had three children.  Michael Allmand (1923–1944), Christopher's much older brother, attended Ampleforth College and read history at Oxford. He joined the British Indian Army in 1942 and was attached to the 6th Gurkha Rifles. He was killed at the age of 20 leading an assault on heavily defended positions, and was posthumously awarded a Victoria Cross.  Allmand and his sister were able to present this medal to the Gurkha Regiment in 1991 and it is now held in the Gurkha Museum in Winchester. His sister Marguerite read Modern Languages at the University of London and went on to work at Bletchley Park during World War 2.

Allmand was devoted to his wife, Bernadette, who predeceased him by nine months. As a lifelong Catholic, he attended and served Bishop Iton Church in Woolton, Liverpool, acting as sacristan in later years. He died on 16 November 2022, at the age of 86.

Influence 
Allmand's pioneering work on the social history of the Hundred Years' War opened up new avenues of interest and research.  Bilingual by virtue of a French mother, his comprehensive knowledge of French national and departmental archives, not to mention libraries and archives across Europe, enabled him to find and explore sources little-known or used by other scholars.  For example, his knowledge of the archives of the Caen chambre des comptes and its chequered history opened up a key source for others.

Indeed, Allmand never strayed far from sources, whether printed or archival, and this familiarity with their uses and abuses made him, among much else, an expert editor of the work of others, most notably volume 7 of the New Cambridge Medieval History.  He edited several collections of essays in meticulous but supportive fashion. His own published interests were eclectic:  spies and spying, civil lawyers, medieval Cheshire, diplomacy and military strategy were just a few.

Perhaps his best-known work is a magisterial biography of Henry V, published as part of the authoritative Yale English Monarchs series.  This work goes far beyond the orthodox Shakespeare-dominated image of a king at war and places this complex monarch in an appropriate context of, for example, wide-ranging respect from chroniclers and contemporaries for the good governance and law and order considered essential to successful medieval kingship.

Among other aspects of his research interest were concerns for the non-combatant, and in particular, taking a lead from H J Hewitt's innovative The Organisation of War under Edward III in what might be termed the logistics and practicalities of how medieval warfare were conducted and changed across two centuries.

Allmand's generous scholarship and bilingualism enabled him to work closely with leading French historians of the Hundred Years' War, including Professor Philippe Contamine and Professor Jean-Philippe Genet. His kindness towards and encouragement of younger scholars were, to deploy an overused term, legendary, and his wisdom is regularly cited by many historians with an interest in Anglo-Norman and Anglo-French themes  such as Professor Anne Curry. He presented regularly at conferences in Normandy and France and published numerous articles in French.  His final collection of articles, brought together as Aspects of War in the Late Middle Ages, included a number of pieces translated by Allmand from French to English.

Select publications

Society at War.  The Experience of England and France during the Hundred Years' War, ed. C.T.Allmand (new edition). Boydell and Brewer. 1973. 

Henry V (English Monarchs Series).  Berkeley and Los Angeles. University of California Press. 1992. 

Aspects of  War in the Late Middle Ages.  London:  Routledge.  2022

References

External links
Home page at the University of Liverpool.
https://news.liverpool.ac.uk/2022/12/05/obituary-professor-christopher-allmand/

1936 births
2022 deaths
Academics of the University of Liverpool
British medievalists
English historians
Alumni of Oriel College, Oxford
People educated at Ampleforth College